The 2021 Laver Cup was the fourth edition of the Laver Cup, a men's tennis tournament between teams from Europe and the rest of the world. It was held on indoor hard courts at the TD Garden in Boston, United States from 24 until 26 September.

It was originally scheduled for September 2020, but was postponed due to the COVID-19 pandemic to avoid overlapping with the 2020 French Open, which was rescheduled for 20 September to 4 October.

Team Europe captain Björn Borg and Team World captain John McEnroe reprised their roles from 2019.

Team Europe won the title for a fourth consecutive edition.

Player selection
Roger Federer was originally the first player to confirm his participation for Team Europe on 28 February 2020, but withdrew on 15 August 2021 due to a right knee injury. However, he still attended the tournament to great fanfare. Rafael Nadal also opted out due to a foot injury and Novak Djokovic opted out due to his busy schedule, having played the Olympics and US Open. Dominic Thiem announced his participation on 24 November 2020, but withdrew on 18 August 2021 due to a wrist injury. 

On 16 July 2021, Matteo Berrettini announced he was joining Team Europe. Five days later, Denis Shapovalov, Félix Auger-Aliassime and Diego Schwartzman were the first players confirmed for Team World. On 13 August 2021, organizers announced that Olympic champion Alexander Zverev would join Team Europe. The next day, Daniil Medvedev was also announced. Team Europe then announced its final line-up on 18 August 2021 with Stefanos Tsitsipas, Andrey Rublev and Casper Ruud also taking part. Team World captain John McEnroe chose Reilly Opelka, John Isner and Nick Kyrgios as his final picks the following day.

Prize money 
The total prize money for 2021 Laver Cup is set at $2,250,000 for all 12 participating players.

Each winning team member will pocket $250,000, which marks no increase in prize money compared to 2019.

Whereas, each of the losing team members will earn $125,000 each.

Participants

Matches
Each match win on day 1 was worth one point, on day 2 two points and on day 3 three points. The first team to 13 points won. Since four matches were played each day, there were a total of 24 points available. However, since 12 of the total points are earned on day 3, neither team could win prior to the final day of play.

Player statistics

Post-tournament exhibition doubles match 
As only one match was required on Day 3 (Sunday) of the 2021 Laver Cup, an exhibition match was played following the trophy ceremony.

References

External links

2021
2021 ATP Tour
2021 in American tennis
2021 in Boston
2021 in sports in Massachusetts
September 2021 sports events in the United States
Sports competitions in Boston
Tennis events postponed due to the COVID-19 pandemic
Tennis tournaments in the United States